Edmond Jacques Eckel (1845–1934) was an architect in Missouri. One of his firms was Eckel & Mann.  Eckel's name has been spelled with variations including Edmund rather than Edmond and with Jacques spelled as Jaques.

Eckel was born in Strasbourg in the Alsace region of France.  He apprenticed and studied at a few places before entering study at the prestigious Ecole des Beaux Arts in 1864.  He came to St. Joseph, Missouri.

George R. Eckel was Edmond's son, also an architect. Eckel & Aldrich was a partnership of father, son, and Aldrich.

Projects
A number of Eckel's and the firms' works are listed on the U.S. National Register of Historic Places, with various spelling errors.

Works include (with attribution):
Nathan Phipps and Elmarine Ogden Mansion, 809 Hall St. (St. Joseph, Missouri), 1885, known today as the Shakespeare Chateau due to a beautiful bust of William Shakespeare carved into marble above the main fireplace.
Albany Carnegie Public Library (1906), 101 W. Clay St., Albany, MO (Eckel, Edmond Jacques), NRHP-listed
Central Police Station (1909), 701 Messanie, St. Joseph, MO (Eckel, Edmund Jaques), NRHP-listed
One or more works in Central-North Commercial Historic District, roughly bounded by N. 4th, Main, Francis and Robidoux Sts., St. Joseph, MO (Eckel & Mann; Eckel, Edmund J.), NRHP-listed
City Hose Company No. 9 (1901), 2217 Frederick Ave., St. Joseph, MO (Eckel, Edmond J.), NRHP-listed
 Corby-Forsee Building (1921 addition), 5th and Felix Sts., St. Joseph, MO, NRHP-listed
Edmond Jacques Eckel House (1885), 515 N. 4th St., St. Joseph, MO (Eckel, Edmond Jacques), NRHP-listed
Dr. Jacob Geiger House-Maud Wyeth Painter House (1911–12), 2501 Frederick Ave., St. Joseph, MO (Eckel & Aldrich), NRHP-listed
Gentry County Courthouse, Public Sq., Albany, MO (Eckel & Mann), NRHP-listed
German-American Bank Building, 624 Felix St., St. Joseph, MO (Eckel & Mann), NRHP-listed
Hamilton House, 1228 W. Main, Bethany, MO (Eckel, Edmund), NRHP-listed
One or more works in Kemper Addition Historic District, portions of Clay, Union, Kemper and Bon Ton Sts., St. Joseph, MO (Eckel, E.J., et al.), NRHP-listed
Krug Park Place Historic District, roughly bounded by St. Joseph Ave., Myrtle St., Clark St., and Magnolia Ave., St. Joseph, MO (Eckel, E.J., et al.), NRHP-listed
Livestock Exchange Building, 601 Illinois Ave., St. Joseph, MO (Eckel, Edmond J.), NRHP-listed
Miller-Porter-Lacy House (1902 enlargement), 2912 Frederick Blvd., St. Joseph, MO (Eckel, Edmund Jacques), NRHP-listed
 Neely Elementary School (modifications), 1909 S. 12th St., St. Joseph, Missouri, NRHP-listed
Nodaway County Courthouse, 3rd and Main Sts., Maryville, MO (Eckel & Mann), NRHP-listed
One or more works in Patee Town Historic District, roughly bounded by Penn St., S. 11th St., Lafayette St. and S. 15th St., St. Joseph, MO (Eckel, E.J.), NRHP-listed
Samuel and Pauline Peery House, 1105 N. Hundley St., Albany, MO (Eckel, Edmond Jacques), NRHP-listed
John D. Richardson Dry Goods Company (1892), 300 N. 3rd St., St. Joseph, MO, NRHP-listed
One or more works in Robidoux Hill Historic District, roughly bounded by Franklin St., Robidoux St., Fourth St., Louis St., and Fifth St., St. Joseph, MO (Eckel, Edmund Jacques), NRHP-listed
Robidoux School (1909), 201 S. 10th St., St. Joseph, MO (Eckel and Boschen), NRHP-listed
South Fourth Street Commercial Historic District, roughly bounded by S. 3rd, S. 5th, Charles and Messanie Sts., St. Joseph, MO (Eckel, Edmund J.), NRHP-listed
St. Joseph City Hall (1926–27), Frederick Ave. at Eleventh St., St. Joseph, MO (Eckel & Aldrich), NRHP-listed
St. Joseph Public Library, 10th and Felix Sts., St. Joseph, MO (Eckel, Edmond Jacques), NRHP-listed
St. Joseph Public Library-Carnegie Branch, 316 Massachusetts St., St. Joseph, MO (Eckel, Edmund J.), NRHP-listed
One or more works in St. Joseph's Commerce and Banking Historic District, roughly bounded by 3rd, 91t, Francis, and Edmonds St., St. Joseph, MO Eckel, E.J., NRHP-listed
Virginia Flats, 516–518 and 520–528 N. 10th St., St. Joseph, MO (Eckel & Mann), NRHP-listed
Wholesale Row, bounded by Jules, 3rd, 4th, and Francis Sts., St. Joseph, MO (Eckel, Edmund Jacques), NRHP-listed

Works by George R. Eckel
DeKalb County Courthouse, 109 W. Main St., Maysville, MO (Eckel, George R.), NRHP-listed

References

19th-century American architects
1845 births
1934 deaths
Architects from Missouri
20th-century American architects
Architects from Strasbourg
People from St. Joseph, Missouri
École des Beaux-Arts alumni